Regional elections were held in Belgium on 7 June 2009 to choose representatives in the regional parliaments of Flanders, Wallonia, Brussels and the German-speaking Community of Belgium. These elections were held on the same day as the European elections.

The Parliament of the French Community is composed of all elected members of the Walloon Parliament (except German-speakers) and the first 19 French-speaking members of the Brussels Parliament.

Flemish Parliament

All 124 members of the Flemish Parliament were elected. The five Flemish provinces (West Flanders, East Flanders, Antwerp, Flemish Brabant and Limburg) each are a constituency, plus the Brussels-Capital Region where those voting for a Dutch-language party could also vote in the Flemish election.

Details

Walloon Parliament

Brussels Regional Parliament

All 89 members of the Parliament of the Brussels-Capital Region were elected. Those voting for a Dutch-language party could also cast a vote for the Flemish parliamentary election.

Parliament of the German-speaking Community
All 25 members of the Parliament of the German-speaking Community were elected.

References

External links
Official 2009 elections website
Tractothèque - Electoral posters and leaflets

2009 elections in Belgium
2009
June 2009 events in Europe